Jeremy Durrin (born August 11, 1988) is an American former professional road and cyclo-cross cyclist. He represented his nation in the men's elite event at the 2016 UCI Cyclo-cross World Championships in Heusden-Zolder.

Major results

2011–2012
 3rd Baystate Cyclo-cross
2012–2013
 1st Baystate Cyclo-cross
 2nd NEPCX - The Cycle-Smart International 1
 2nd Downeast Cyclo-cross - NECX - Day 2
 2nd Nittany Lion Cross
 2nd Rohrbach's Ellison Park Cyclocross
 3rd Baystate Cyclo-cross - NECX
 3rd HPCX
2013–2014
 1st Baystate Cyclo-cross - NECX
 2nd Super Cross Cup 2
 3rd Baystate Cyclo-cross
2014–2015
 2nd The Cycle-Smart International 2
 3rd Trek CXC Cup 2
 3rd Nittany Lion Cross 2
2015–2016
 1st Manitoba Grand Prix of Cyclocross
 3rd Kingsport Cyclo-cross Cup
 3rd Resolution 'Cross Cup 1
 3rd Highlander 'Cross Cup
2016–2017
 1st Nittany Lion Cross 1 & 2
 2nd NBX Gran Prix of Cross 1
 2nd HPCX 2
 3rd The Cycle-Smart Northampton International
 3rd Gran Prix of Gloucester 1
2017–2018
 3rd Overall British National Trophy Series
3rd Derby

References

External links
 

1988 births
Living people
Cyclo-cross cyclists
American male cyclists
Sportspeople from the Bronx